Hebe was a 250-ton full-rigged ship launched in 1803 at Chittagong. She struck a reef between Low Head and Western Head on the entrance to Port Dalrymple, Tasmania, Australia, on 15 June 1808 and became a total loss.

Hebe was carrying a cargo of Indian goods from Madras to Sydney, Australia when she was wrecked.  All the crew except for one lascar escaped drowning and returned with the ship's master, Joseph Leigh, to Sydney aboard Estramina on 11 October 1808.

See also
 Low Head Lighthouse
 Shipwrecks of Tasmania

Notes, citations, and references
Notes

Citations

Reference
 
 

1803 ships
British ships built in India
History of New South Wales
Individual sailing vessels
Shipwrecks of Tasmania
Maritime incidents in 1808
Age of Sail merchant ships
Merchant ships of the United Kingdom